Verkhnyaya Amga (literally Upper Amga; , Üöhee Amma) is a rural locality (a selo), one of five settlements, in addition to Tommot, the administrative centre of the settlement, the Urban-type settlement of Bezymyanny, and the villages of Ulu and Yllymakh in the Town of Tommot of Aldansky District in the Sakha Republic, Russia. Its population as of the 2010 Census was 27; up from 19 recorded in the 2002 Census.

Geography
It is located on the right bank of the Amga River. The village is the location of road and rail bridges over the Amga River, carrying the highway to Yakutsk and the Amur Yakutsk Mainline railway.  It is served by a railway station, named simply Amga. The village was founded in 1938 as a service point during the construction of the highway to Yakutsk.

References

Notes

Sources
Official website of the Sakha Republic. Registry of the Administrative-Territorial Divisions of the Sakha Republic. Aldansky District. 

Rural localities in Aldansky District